Adalberto Jose Jordan (born December 7, 1961) is an American lawyer who serves as a United States circuit judge of the United States Court of Appeals for the Eleventh Circuit. He is also an adjunct professor at the University of Miami School of Law, his alma mater, and at Florida International University's College of Law. In February 2016, The New York Times identified Jordan as a potential Supreme Court nominee to replace Justice Antonin Scalia. In early March, Jordan removed himself from consideration.

Early life and education 
Jordan was born in Havana, Cuba and came with his family to Miami, Florida when he was a young boy, in 1968. Jordan graduated from St. Brendan High School in 1980. He received a Bachelor of Arts degree in politics, magna cum laude, from the University of Miami, in 1984. While an undergraduate at the University of Miami, Jordan was a walk-on member of the baseball team. Jordan then earned his Juris Doctor summa cum laude, from the University of Miami School of Law in 1987, where he was the Articles & Comments Editor for the University of Miami Law Review, graduating second in his law school class.

Career 
Jordan served as a clerk for Judge Thomas Alonzo Clark of the United States Court of Appeals for the Eleventh Circuit in Atlanta, Georgia from 1987 to 1988, and for Justice Sandra Day O'Connor of the United States Supreme Court from 1988 to 1989. In 1989, Jordan returned to Miami to work as an associate for Steel Hector & Davis, a prestigious local law firm that was acquired by Squire, Sanders & Dempsey in 2005.  Despite being there a relatively short time, Jordan was named a partner at Steel, Hector & Davis by his fifth year. Shortly after making partner, Jordan made the transition to public-sector lawyering, and became an Assistant United States Attorney for the Southern District of Florida in 1994. In 1998, he was appointed Chief of the Appellate Division, and served in that position for about one year. Since 1990, he has been an adjunct professor at the University of Miami School of Law.

Federal judicial service

District court service 
On March 15, 1999, President Bill Clinton nominated Jordan to the seat on the United States District Court for the Southern District of Florida that had been vacated by Judge Lenore Carrero Nesbitt. Jordan was confirmed to the federal bench by the United States Senate on September 8, 1999, by a 93–1 vote, with then-Senator Bob Smith of New Hampshire as the lone dissenting vote. Jordan received his commission on September 9, 1999. His service as a district court judge was terminated on February 24, 2012 when he was elevated to the United States Court of Appeals for the Eleventh Circuit.

Eleventh Circuit service 
In May 2011, the South Florida Daily Business Review reported that Jordan was being vetted by the Federal Bureau of Investigation in anticipation of President Obama nominating Jordan to a vacancy on the United States Court of Appeals for the Eleventh Circuit created Judge Susan H. Black assumed senior status in February 2011. On August 2, 2011, President Barack Obama nominated Jordan for the judgeship.

On October 13, 2011, the Senate Judiciary Committee approved his nomination by a voice vote. On February 9, 2012, Senate Majority Leader Harry Reid moved to invoke cloture on Jordan's nomination, thereby cutting off debate and ending a Republican filibuster of Jordan's nomination. A cloture vote took place on February 13, 2012, which was invoked by an 89–5 vote. On February 15, 2012, the United States Senate confirmed Jordan to the seat on the Eleventh Circuit by a 94–5 vote. Jordan received his judicial commission on February 17, 2012.

Notable cases

In Jones et al. v. DeSantis, a 2020 voting rights case, Jordan wrote a 94 page dissenting opinion. 2018 Florida Amendment 4 permitted former felons to vote, however DeSantis signed a law that required former felons to pay all legal fees before being eligible to vote again, despite some of them not knowing how much they owed. By a 6-4 vote, the 11th circuit upheld that law. Jordan concluded his dissent with "Paying hundreds of dollars in fees and costs is an “onerous” burden to those with limited means, and 70 to 80 percent of Florida felons are indigent. They should not be forced to choose between “putting food on the table, a roof over their heads, and clothes on their backs,” — or paying fees that Florida uses to fund government operations—in order to exercise the right to vote granted to them by Amendment 4."

Personal life 
Adalberto Jordan is married to Lazara Esther Jordan, née Castillo, a teacher at St. Brendan Catholic High School, of which both are alumni.

See also 
Barack Obama Supreme Court candidates
Barack Obama judicial appointment controversies
List of Hispanic/Latino American jurists
List of law clerks of the Supreme Court of the United States (Seat 8)

References

External links 

Florida Bar profile

|-

1961 births
Living people
20th-century American judges
20th-century American lawyers
21st-century American judges
American judges of Cuban descent
Assistant United States Attorneys
Cuban emigrants to the United States
Hispanic and Latino American judges
Hispanic and Latino American lawyers
Judges of the United States Court of Appeals for the Eleventh Circuit
Judges of the United States District Court for the Southern District of Florida
Law clerks of the Supreme Court of the United States
Miami Hurricanes baseball players
People from Havana
People from Miami
United States court of appeals judges appointed by Barack Obama
United States district court judges appointed by Bill Clinton
University of Miami faculty
University of Miami School of Law alumni